Iosif Iser (21 May 1881 – 25 April 1958; born and died in Bucharest) was a Romanian painter and graphic artist.

Born to a Jewish family, he was initially inspired by Expressionism, creating drawings with thick, unmodulated, lines and steep angles. After studies in Munich and Paris (with, among others, André Derain), Iser worked for the socialist press (Facla and the original version of Adevărul), publishing a large number of caricatures (most of them satirising the Romanian Monarchy). He also started his first series of paintings with Dobrujan themes, usually featuring local Tatar portraits.

Around 1920, Iosif Iser adopted a more luminous range of colours, while softening the textures. He continued his "Tatar" themes with his Tătăroaică în albastru ("Tatar Woman in Blue") and Famile de tătari ("Tatar Family"). He expanded on another series, one that depicted harlequins.

In 1955, he was elected a full member of the Romanian Academy.

Notes

Graphics

External links
 
 Biographical sketch at Judaica.ro 
 Profile at artline.ro

Romanian painters
Romanian caricaturists
Romanian cartoonists
Expressionist painters
Adevărul people
Artists from Bucharest
Romanian Jews
Jewish painters
Titular members of the Romanian Academy
1881 births
1958 deaths